Yevgeni Aleksandrovich Shamrin (born 6 December 1982) is a former Russian professional football player.

Club career
He played 6 seasons in the Russian Football National League for 4 different teams.

References

External links
 

1982 births
Sportspeople from Lipetsk
Living people
Russian footballers
Association football goalkeepers
FC Metallurg Lipetsk players
FC Zvezda Irkutsk players
FC Salyut Belgorod players
FC SKA-Khabarovsk players